The Alberta Senior Hockey League was a senior amateur ice hockey league operating in the Canadian province of Alberta between 1965 and 1978.

Champions
1965-66 : Edmonton Oil Kings
1966-67 : Not Played
1967-68 : Drumheller Miners
1968-69 : Calgary Stampeders
1969-70 : Calgary Stampeders
1970-71 : Calgary Stampeders
1977-78 : Calgary Trojans (regular season champion)

External links
League profile on hockeydb.com

Defunct ice hockey leagues in Alberta